Adrián Martín Cardona (born 10 October 1982 in Las Palmas, Canary Islands) is a Spanish former footballer who played as a midfielder.

Football career
After first appearing as a professional in the 2003–04 season with UD Las Palmas in Segunda División, Martín switched to Segunda División B, achieving promotion with Real Madrid's reserves Real Madrid Castilla. On 6 December 2005 he played his first and only official game with the latter's first team, featuring the second half of a 1–2 away loss against Olympiacos F.C. for the campaign's UEFA Champions League after coming on as a substitute for another cantera product, Javier Balboa.

From 2006 to 2008, Martín had second level stints with Real Murcia and Xerez CD (the latter on loan), where he was rarely used. In July 2008 he signed with Levante UD also in that tier, and subsequently resumed his career in division three.

References

External links

1982 births
Living people
Footballers from Las Palmas
Spanish footballers
Association football midfielders
Segunda División players
Segunda División B players
Tercera División players
UD Las Palmas Atlético players
UD Las Palmas players
Real Madrid Castilla footballers
Real Madrid CF players
Real Murcia players
Xerez CD footballers
Levante UD footballers
Jerez Industrial CF players
CD Teruel footballers
Zamora CF footballers
UB Conquense footballers
Xerez Deportivo FC footballers